KJOY (99.3 FM) is a commercial radio station in Stockton, California. The station is owned by Cumulus Media and broadcasts an adult contemporary radio format, switching to Christmas music for much of November and December.  The radio studios and offices are on Transworld Drive in Stockton.  It uses the slogan "Lite Rock, Less Talk."

KJOY has an effective radiated power (ERP) of 4,000 watts.  The transmitter is off West Lane in Stockton, near the Calaveras River.

History
On , the station first signed on.  Its original call sign was KJAX.  Owned by Joseph Gamble Stations Inc., it was the FM sister station to KJOY (1280 AM, now KWSX). On November 15, 1989, KJAX changed its call letters to KJOY-FM.

On June 26, 1998, Joseph Gamble Stations sold KJOY to Silverado Broadcasting, headed by Ron Miller, for $3.6 million. In February 2003, Silverado sold four stations, including KJOY, to Citadel Broadcasting for $25.5 million. On March 10, 2011, Cumulus Media purchased Citadel for $2.4 billion. The deal closed on September 16, 2011 following a review of the deal by the Federal Communications Commission and divestitures required to comply with ownership limits.

References

External links

Cumulus Media radio stations
Mainstream adult contemporary radio stations in the United States
Radio stations established in 1968
1968 establishments in California